Volker Hermann Weidler (born 18 March 1962) is a retired racing driver from Germany, best known for winning the 24 Hours of Le Mans in 1991.

Career

Formula racing
In 1985, he became German Formula Three champion.

In the 1989 Formula One season, Weidler entered 10 Formula One Grands Prix, racing for the Rial team, but failed to qualify the uncompetitive car on every occasion.

After Formula One, he moved to Japan and raced in the Japanese Formula 3000 Championship and the All Japan Sports Prototype Championship. He often fought over the title with Kazuyoshi Hoshino, Ross Cheever and others in the Japanese Formula 3000, and became popular in Japan.

GT / Sportscars
In 1991, Weidler teamed with Johnny Herbert and Bertrand Gachot to win Le Mans behind the wheel of the Wankel engine-powered Mazda 787B, marking also the first win of the legendary French race by both a Japanese manufacturer and engine supplier. This Wankel engine-powered car was noted for being very loud.

Possibly related to the hours spent in the noisy Mazda, Weidler began to suffer from an ear problem (sensorineural hearing loss) which eventually forced him to retire prematurely from the Japanese Formula 3000 Championship during the 1992 season though Weidler was leading the championship at that time.

When Weidler left the Japanese team, Nova Engineering, he recommended Heinz-Harald Frentzen as his successor.

Post-racing career
Weidler now works as a managing director for Weidler, a building cleaning company owned by his family, based in Weinheim.

Racing record

Complete International Formula 3000 results
(key) (Races in bold indicate pole position; races in italics indicate fastest lap.)

Complete Japanese Formula 3000 results
(key) (Races in bold indicate pole position) (Races in italics indicate fastest lap)

Complete Formula One results
(key)

Complete 24 Hours of Le Mans Results
Class winners in bold.  Cars failing to complete 70% of the winner's distance marked as Not Classified (NC).

References
Footnotes

Sources
Profile at F1 Rejects
Driver Database Profile

1962 births
Living people
German racing drivers
German Formula One drivers
Rial Formula One drivers
24 Hours of Le Mans drivers
24 Hours of Le Mans winning drivers
German Formula Three Championship drivers
Japanese Formula 3000 Championship drivers
International Formula 3000 drivers
Sportspeople from Heidelberg
Racing drivers from Baden-Württemberg
World Sportscar Championship drivers

Oreca drivers
RSM Marko drivers
Walter Lechner Racing drivers
Josef Kaufmann Racing drivers
Team Joest drivers